Ralph Forbes (born Ralph Forbes Taylor; 30 September 1904 – 31 March 1951) was an English film and stage actor active in Britain and the United States.

Early life
Forbes was born in Wandsworth, London, the son of Ernest John "E.J." and Ethel Louise Taylor. His mother would become known as Mary Forbes, a stage and film actress. His younger sister was actress Brenda Forbes (born Dorothy Brenda Taylor). Born on 30 September 1904, Forbes was baptized on 6 November and his birth was legally registered with the authorities during the last quarter of 1904.

Forbes met with an accident while playing football at Denstone College in Staffordshire which resulted in a scar on his cheek. He came to the United States as a member of a British troupe that performed Havoc, a war play. He started off in films, then went on stage.

In the United States he appeared onstage opposite actress Ruth Chatterton, whom he wed on 20 December 1924 in New York City. He was 20 years old and she was four days shy of her 32nd birthday. The couple divorced in 1932. He married actress Heather Angel in Yuma, Arizona, on 29 August 1934; that marriage ended in divorce on 18 July 1941. His last wife, whom he married in 1946, was actress Dora Sayers.

Later years
Following a film career that spanned from 1926 to 1944, Forbes’s latter years were given to working on the Broadway stage. One of his last stage appearances was in a revival of Shaw's You Never Can Tell in 1948. He died at Montefiore Hospital in The Bronx, New York, in 1951, aged 46.

Filmography

 The Fifth Form at St. Dominic's (1921) as Oliver Greenfield (film debut)
 A Lowland Cinderella (1921) as Master of Darrock
 The Glorious Adventure (1922) as Courtier (uncredited)
 Comin' Thro the Rye (1923) as George Tempest
 Reveille (1924) as The Kid
 Owd Bob (1924) as Davie McAdam
 Charley's Aunt (1926) as Jack Chesney
 Beau Geste (1926) as John Geste
 Mr. Wu (1927) as Basil Gregory
 The Enemy (1927) as Carl Behrend
 The Latest from Paris (1928) as Joe Adams
 The Trail of '98 (1928) as Larry
 Under the Black Eagle (1928) as Karl von Zorn
 The Actress (1928) as Arthur Gower
 The Whip (1928) as Lord Brancaster
 The Masks of the Devil (1928) as Manfred
 Restless Youth (1928) as Bruce Neil
 Lilies of the Field (1930) as Ted Willing
 The Green Goddess (1930) as Dr. Traherne
 Mamba (1930) as Karl von Reiden
 The Lady of Scandal (1930) as John
 Inside the Lines (1930) as Eric Woodhouse
 Her Wedding Night (1930) as Larry Charters
 The Bachelor Father (1931) - John Ashley
 Beau Ideal (1931) as John Geste
 Thunder Below (1932) as Davis
 Smilin'Through (1932) as Willie Ainley
 Christopher Strong (1933) as Harry Rawlinson
 The Phantom Broadcast (1933) as Norman Wilder
 Pleasure Cruise (1933) as Richard Orloff aka Taversham
 The Avenger (1933) as Norman Craig
 The Solitaire Man (1933) as Robert Bascom
 Bombay Mail (1934) as William Luke-Patson
 The Mystery of Mr. X (1934) as Sir Christopher Marche
 Riptide (1934) as Fenwick
 Twentieth Century (1934) as George Smith
 Shock (1934) as Derek Marbury
 The Fountain (1934) as Ballater
 The Barretts of Wimpole Street (1934) as Captain Surtees Cook
 Outcast Lady (1934) as Boy Fenwick
 Strange Wives (1934) as Paul
 Enchanted April (1935) as Peppo Briggs
 Rescue Squad (1935) as DeWitt Porter
 Streamline Express (1935) as Fred Arnold
 The Goose and the Gander (1935) as Ralph Summers
 The Three Musketeers (1935) as Duke of Buckingham
 La Fiesta de Santa Barbara (1935, Short)
 I'll Name the Murderer (1936) as Tommy Tilton
 Mary of Scotland (1936) as Randolph
 Piccadilly Jim (1936) as Lord Frederick 'Freddie' Priory
 Romeo and Juliet (1936) as Paris - Young Nobleman Kinsman to the Prince
 Daniel Boone (1936) as Stephen Marlowe
 Love Letters of a Star (1936) as Meredith Landers
 Rich Relations (1937) as Dave Walton
 The Last of Mrs. Cheyney (1937) as Cousin John
 The Thirteenth Chair (1937) as Lionel Trent
 The Legion of Missing Men (1937) as Bob Carter
 Make a Wish (1937) as Walter Mays
 Woman Against the World (1937) as Larry Steele
 Stage Door (1937) as Cast of Stage Play
 Women Are Like That (1938) as Martin Brush
 Kidnapped (1938) as James
 If I Were King (1938) as Oliver Le Dain
 Annabel Takes a Tour (1938) as Viscount Ronald River-Clyde
 Convicts at Large (1938) as David Brent
 The Hound of the Baskervilles (1939) as Sir Hugo Baskerville
 The Magnificent Fraud (1939) as Harrison Todd
 The Private Lives of Elizabeth and Essex (1939) as Lord Knollys
 Tower of London (1939) as Henry Tudor
 Calling Philo Vance (1940) as Tom McDonald
 Adventure in Diamonds (1940) as Mr. Perrins
 Curtain Call (1940) as Leslie Barrivale
 Frenchman's Creek (1944) as Harry St. Columb (final film)

References

External links

 
 
 Ralph Forbes at Virtual History

1904 births
1951 deaths
English emigrants to the United States
English male film actors
English male stage actors
English male silent film actors
Male actors from London
People from Wandsworth
20th-century English male actors